Uta Schorn (born 7 August 1957) is a German gymnast. She competed at the 1972 Summer Olympics and the 1976 Summer Olympics.

References

1957 births
Living people
German female artistic gymnasts
Olympic gymnasts of West Germany
Gymnasts at the 1972 Summer Olympics
Gymnasts at the 1976 Summer Olympics
Sportspeople from Cologne